The 2009 European Women Basketball Championship, commonly called EuroBasket Women 2009, was the 32nd regional championship held by FIBA Europe. The competition was held in Latvia from June 7 to June 20, 2009.

Qualified teams 
 – as host.
,  – top two teams in Group A.
,  – top two teams in Group B.
,  – top two teams in Group C.
,  – top two teams in Group D.
 – best third team.
,  – winners of Group A and Group B of the Additional Qualifying Round.

Qualification

Squads 

At the start of tournament, all 16 participating countries had 12 players on their roster.

Venues 

The tournament will be held in three cities. The Preliminary Round will be played at Liepāja and Valmiera, while the Qualifying and Final Round will be played at Riga.

Competition System

Preliminary Round (June 7 – June 9) 
The 16 participants will be divided into four groups of four teams each. The top three teams in each group will advance to the Qualifying Round. The last team will be eliminated.

Qualifying Round (June 11 – June 16) 
There will be two groups of six teams, each composed of the qualifiers from two Preliminary Round groups. The results in the Preliminary Round will be taken into account. Each team will play the teams that qualified from the other group. The top four teams will advance to the Quarterfinals. The bottom two teams will be eliminated.

Final Round (June 18 – June 20) 
This stage will be played in a knock-out system. In the quarterfinals, the first team in one group will play the fourth team in the other group, while the second place team will play against the third team in the opposite group. The winners of the quarterfinals will advance to the semifinals, and the winners of the semis will progress to the Finals. The losers in the quarterfinals will play for fifth to eighth places.

Preliminary round

Group A

Group B

Group C

Group D

Qualifying round

Group E

Group F

Knockout stage

Championship bracket

5th place bracket

Quarterfinals

Classification rounds

Semifinals

Seventh place game

Fifth place game

Third place game

Final 

All EuroBasket Women 2009 team:
Svetlana Abrosimova
Anete Jēkabsone-Žogota()
Sandrine Gruda
Céline Dumerc
Evanthia Maltsi

Final standings

World championship qualification 

The teams qualified  to 2010 FIBA World Championship for Women in the Czech Republic are:
 
 
 
 
 
  as host nation

See also 
EuroBasket 2009

References

External links 
 EuroBasket Women 2009
 EuroBasket Women
 EuroBasket 2009 Women
 FIBA Europe – EuroBasket Women 

 
2009
EuroBasket Women
EuroBasket Women
International women's basketball competitions hosted by Latvia
June 2009 sports events in Europe
2008–09 in Latvian basketball
Valmiera
Sport in Liepāja
2000s in Riga
Sports competitions in Riga